Camp Echo may refer to:
 Camp Echo (Guantanamo), used as an isolation unit, is a venue where detainees meet with their lawyers
 Camp Echo (Iraq), see Polish zone in Iraq
Camp Five Echo
Camp Echo Lake business
Camp Echo Grove
Camp Echo (Highasakite album)

See also
Echo Camp